David Boulware is a professor of medicine with tenure and a practicing infectious disease physician at the University of Minnesota Medical School. He is a member of the graduate faculty for the University of Minnesota School of Public Health Epidemiology PhD program and for the Microbiology, Immunology, and Cancer Biology (MICaB) graduate program. Boulware was the first Lois & Richard Distinguished Assistant Professorship at the University of Minnesota. Boulware is an active medical researcher engaged in clinical trials in infectious diseases.

Career 

Boulware's primary research has been focused on improving the diagnosis, prevention, and treatment of cryptococcal meningitis. However, he is best known for outpatient COVID-19 clinical trials, pioneering remote de-centralized, internet-based clinical trials during the COVID-19 pandemic.

Boulware's team rapidly launched a series of three U.S. nationwide randomized clinical trials testing hydroxychloroquine for post-exposure prophylaxis, early treatment, and pre-exposure prophylaxis for prevention of COVID-19 on March 17, 2020. These were among the first U.S. trials to be launched. The pre-exposure prophylaxis trial was reported June 3, 2020 showing that taking hydroxychloroquine was not effective at preventing COVID-19. As described, "To say that the recruitment of this post-exposure prophylaxis trial was innovative hardly gives the methods enough credit." These trials were pioneering for being remote internet-based randomized decentralized clinical trials.

The hydroxychloroquine early treatment trial was the first large phase III, outpatient randomized clinical trial testing an outpatient therapy for COVID-19.  
  
While pre-exposure prophylaxis with hydroxychloroquine for prevention was promoted on May 18, 2020, the subsequent randomized trial did not show any benefit.

Boulware served as senior investigator on other trials testing early treatments for covid-19 including the TogetherTrial ivermectin;, which demonstrated that ivermectin did not have a clinical benefit for early COVID-19.
University of Minnesota's COVID-Out randomized trial testing metformin, ivermectin, and fluvoxamine. The Covid-Out trial reported a 42% reduction in COVID-related emergency room visits and hospitalizations with the use of metformin. In December 2021, Boulware took the initiate to apply to the U.S. FDA for an Emergency Use Authorization for fluvoxamine 100 mg twice daily.

Boulware serves as the national co-chair of the trial steering committee for the NIH ACTIV-6 platform clinical trial testing repurposed medicines for COVID-19.

Notable contributions and honors 
 World Health Organization 2017 Guidelines for managing advanced HIV disease and rapid initiation of antiretroviral therapy
 World Health Organization 2018 Guidelines for the diagnosis, prevention and management of cryptococcal disease in HIV-infected adults, adolescents and children
 US Guidelines for the Prevention and Treatment of Opportunistic Infections in Adults and Adolescents with HIV—guideline committee member 
 American Society for Clinical Investigation, honorary medicine society elected member 2020.

References

External links
 

1974 births
University of Minnesota faculty
Living people
COVID-19 researchers
Wabash College alumni